Wewak Islands Rural LLG is a local-level government (LLG) of East Sepik Province, Papua New Guinea. Various Schouten languages are spoken in this LLG.

Wards
01. Biem 1 (Biem language speakers)
02. Biem 2 (Biem language speakers)
03. Kadowar (Biem language speakers)
04. Ruprup 1 (Biem language speakers)
05. Ruprup 2 (Biem language speakers)
06. Wei (Biem language speakers)
07. Koil 1 (Wogeo language speakers)
08. Koil 2 (Wogeo language speakers)
09. Vokeo 1 (Wogeo language speakers)
10. Vokeo 2 (Wogeo language speakers)
11. Koragur 1
12. Koragur 2
13. Shagur
14. Rumalal
15. Serasen
16. Brauniek
17. Mushu 1
18. Mushu 2
19. Walis 1
20. Walis 2
21. Tarawai

References

Local-level governments of East Sepik Province